Geoffrey Norman Gaunt was a Spitfire pilot during the Battle of Britain. He served in the RAF as part of No. 609 Squadron West Riding of Yorkshire Squadron RAF. He was killed in action on 15 September 1940. Gaunt was from a well-known textile family and screen star James Mason was a cousin. He was buried in his family plot at Salendine Nook Baptist Church with his grandparents and later his father was also buried there in 1958. He was good friends with David Moore Crook.

Geoffrey Norman Gaunt served with 609 Squadron Auxiliary Air Force before the war and received some flying training with the unit. He was commissioned into the Auxiliary Air Force in April 1940 and completed his training at the Flying Training School at Cranwell, Lincolnshire in June and July 1940. Gaunt then went to 7 Operational Training Unit at Hawarden, near RAF Sealand, in the North Wales-Chester area. After converting to Spitfire Mark Ones there, Geoffrey Gaunt rejoined 609 Spitfire Squadron on 16 August 1940 at Warmwell in Dorset, close to Weymouth, for the protection of Portland Naval Base and places from Bristol, Somerset, Dorset, Devon, and Cornwall.

Earlier, in May 1940 609 West Riding squadron flew sorties in support of Operation Dynamo - the evacuation of the British Expeditionary Force from Dunkirk during the Battle of France. One-third of the squadron's pilots were lost during a three-day period.

In the Battle of Britain, which started in July 1940, the squadron operated from Middle Wallop, with half the squadron operating from the forward base at Warmwell in Dorset. During August 1940, the squadron destroyed 46 enemy aircraft but nearly all the pre-war auxiliary pilots were lost, either killed or missing. In October 1940, 609 became the first squadron to achieve 100 confirmed aerial victories.

Geoffrey Gaunt had rejoined 609 Squadron on 16 August and got into many combats through the month. He shared in the destruction of a Messerschmitt BF110 fighter on 25 August which was shared Destroyed with P/O Noel Agazarian, who was later a Battle of Britain fighter ace.

Geoffrey Gaunt was killed on 15 September 1940 when he was shot down during an attack on German bombers over London. His Spitfire, R6690, crashed and burned out near Kenley. This day was later known as "Battle of Britain Day" as the continued strength of the RAF fighter defence decided Hitler to postpone and then cancel his planned invasion of Britain.

David Crook wrote a book titled Spitfire Pilot, published by Faber and Faber in 1942, which describes his friends including Geoffrey Gaunt who were killed, one by one as the Battle of Britain carried on through 1940. The book immortalizes these men and Crook also, for he was to die along with his friends in wartime. These included: Geoffrey Gaunt, Noel Agazarian, John Dundas, and Phillip "Pip" Barran.

# A Spitfire flown by "Aggy" Agazarian and pilots including David More Crook, John Dundas, (also killed, like Agazarian and Crook in wartime) hangs today in the Imperial War Museum at Lambeth, London.

# A Memorial Hut to 609 West Riding squadron, complete with a replica Spitfire, a series of wartime portraits of these pilots, relics and memorabilia is at Elvington Airfield for the Yorkshire Air Museum, near York, in tribute to these men like Geoffrey Gaunt who were killed in wartime.

Further reading

Spitfire Pilot by David Crook

Brothers in Arms by Chris Goss (609 Squadron and JG53 in opposition during the Battle of Britain)

Men of the Battle of Britain by Kenneth Wynn

Battle of Britain-Then and Now by Paul Davies

External links
 Warmwell 609 Squadron pictures
 THE BATTLE OF BRITAIN LONDON MONUMENT

References 

1940 deaths
Royal Air Force airmen
The Few
Royal Air Force pilots of World War II
Royal Air Force personnel killed in World War II
Year of birth missing
People from Blackpool
Military personnel from Liverpool
Burials in England